Lebeckia ambigua is a species of flowering plant in the genus Lebeckia.  The species is native to South Africa, around Saldanha Bay and Clanwilliam.

References

External links
 Lebeckia ambigua  at the Encyclopedia of Life

Crotalarieae
Endemic flora of South Africa